Never Tease a Siamese: A Leigh Koslow Mystery is a crime novel by the American writer Edie Claire set in contemporary Pittsburgh, Pennsylvania.

It tells the story of advertising copywriter Leigh Koslow as she investigates the death of wealthy socialite Lilah Murchison. The reclusive millionaire and rumored black widow was detested by most everyone, including her own son, who expects to share his inheritance with the throng of Siamese that inhabit his mother's dreary mansion. But when Lilah's latest will delivers the bulk of her cash to another, unidentified heir, everyone wants answers.

The novel is the fifth in a series of five Leigh Koslow mysteries.

"Edie Claire is a bright new mystery writer. The fast-paced story line retains a serious tone with humorous interludes to ease the tension and turn the sleuthing relatives into real people. A winning amateur sleuth tale that showcases a new talent."— Midwest Book Review

Sources
Contemporary Authors Online. The Gale Group, 2006.

External links
  Author's homepage

2002 American novels
American crime novels
Novels set in Pittsburgh
Signet Books books